The Bavarian Class D IV was a German steam locomotive with the Bavarian Eastern Railway (Bayrische Ostbahn).

These engines had inside frames and Allan valve gear and were delivered in three series, that differed from one another in their dimensions. The original classification D was adopted by the Royal Bavarian State Railways (Königlich Bayerische Staatsbahn) and amended to D IV. Initially, all the engines were taken over by the Deutsche Reichsbahn. However, only six vehicles were given running numbers (88 7021–7026). By the late 1920s, they were all either retired or sold.

See also 
Royal Bavarian State Railways
List of Bavarian locomotives and railbuses

References

0-4-0T locomotives
D 04 Ostbahn
Standard gauge locomotives of Germany
Railway locomotives introduced in 1867
B n2t locomotives